The Thiruppavai is a set of Tamil Hindu hymns attributed to the female poet-saint Andal. In Sri Vaishnavism, she is considered the manifestation of Bhudevi, born as Periyalvar's daughter. She is said to have fasted during the Tamil month of Margaḻi (Dhanu) and composed 30 religious hymns at the age of 5, in praise of the deity Perumal, a regional form of Vishnu.

The Thiruppavai consists of thirty stanzas referred to as pasurams in praise of Perumal. It is a part of the Nalayira Divya Prabandham, a collection of the works of the twelve poet-saints called the Alvars, an important part of the devotional genre of Tamil literature. The Thiruppavai has also been translated into Telugu by Mullapudi Venkataramana as Melupalukula Melukolupu. In this work, Andal calls upon to all people to recite the name and glories of Vishnu.

Genre
Thiruppavai belongs to the Pāvai genre of songs. This genre referred to the Tamil tradition of unmarried girls performing rites and upholding a vow (vrata) of their performance throughout the month of Margaḻi. This practice assumes special significance during Margaḻi: each day of this month gets its name from one of the thirty verses. There are references to this vow in the late-Sangam era Tamil classic anthology called Paripatal.

Andal's thirty songs contain the cardinal principles of Vaishnavism during the month of Margaḻi. Andal assumes the guise of a cowherd girl in these 30 verses. Andal appears intent upon performing a particular religious vow to marry Vishnu and remain in his everlasting company, inviting of all her friends to join her to serve him with her.

Theme
According to the religious hymns the symbolic undertone behind Andal's entreaty to her friends to wake up and seek Krishna subsumes the essence of the three basic mantras in the Vaishnava tradition — the Tirumantram, Dvayam and Charama Sloka that signify the truth of the paramatma or the Supreme being who dwells in everything. There is a hidden meaning in the 27th pasuram, for example, where Andal explains the importance of an acharya whose guidance is mandatory for a disciple to get these trio of mantras. If the meaning is taken literally, it appears that Kodhai Devi is asking for some of the ornaments for the vratham, but in there explains the importance of these three mantras in a symbolic way. Every pasuram has this detailed undertone which must actually be realized.

Tiruppavai is said to be 'Vedam Anaithukkum Vithagum', meaning it is the seed of the Vedas. As the entire tree and the trees coming from it are hidden in the subtle seed, so is the entire essence of the Vedas is hidden in Thiruppavai which can be revealed only under the guidance of an acharya or a guru who is well versed in Vedic scriptures.

This entire hidden essence is mentioned in the Andal's verses in the form of poetry.

Overview
The first five stanzas provide an introduction to the main theme, its principle and purpose. According to Andal one should give up luxuries during this season. Sincere prayers to the God would bring abundant rain and thus prosperity. Offering Krishna fresh flowers would expiate sins committed earlier and those that may be committed in future.

In the next ten stanzas she describes the importance of community participation. She invites her friends to gather flowers. She essays the ambience at her village, the chirping of birds, colorful blossoms, the musical sound of butter-churning, herds of cattle with tinkling bells, the sounding of the conch from the temple.

She visits each household and awakens all her friends to join her for a bath in a nearby pond. She also praises the incarnations of the deity. The next five stanzas describe her visit to the temple accompanied by her friends. She desires to render a suprabhatham gently to wake up the deity. The group appeases the temple guards, enters the temple and recites prayers extolling the parents of  Krishna and begging them to wake up Krishna and Balarama. Then they approach Niladevi, the consort of the deity, to have a darshana.

The last nine stanzas are on the glories of the deity. On receiving his blessings Andal lists her demands; milk for the vrata, white conch, lamps, flowers, and rich costume and jewellery, plenty of ghee and butter. The concluding stanza is an envoie identifying her as the daughter of Vishnucitthar (Periyalvar) who made this garland of 30 pasurams and says those who recite with devotion will have Krishna's blessings.

Verses and Explanation

The Thiruppavai also includes three taniyans (literally, 'singletons' or standalone verses) composed by later authors to introduce older texts. The first thaniyan, 'Nila tungastana ... ' in Sanskrit was composed by Parashara Bhattar, and the next two taniyans, 'Anna vayal pudhuvai ...   and "Choodi kodutha..." (translated below) were composed by Sri Uyyakondar.Taniyan'''

This song is a prelude to Thiruppavai and is one of the 3 taniyans.

Andal from the swan filled Puduvai,
Sang she, in her sweet voice,
Several enchanting sweet odes,
For being sung during,
The worship and adulation of Pavai.
They are but a garland to him,
From her who wore them first,
Before presenting them to Him.

Each pasuram (ode to Perumal) of Thiruppavai is generally named by the first few words of the religious hymns. These are given first and a translation into verse given then:-

Recital in Thailand

In Thailand, an annual Giant Swing ceremony known as Triyampavai-Tripavai was held in major cities until 1935, when it was abolished for safety reasons. The name of the ceremony was derived from the names of two Tamil Hindu chants: Thiruvempavai (a Shaivite hymn by Manikkavacakar) and Thiruppavai. It is known that Tamil verses from Thiruvempavai — poet pratu sivalai'' ("opening the portals of Shiva's home") — were recited at this ceremony, as well as the coronation ceremony of the Thai king. According to T.P. Meenakshisundaram, the name of the festival indicates that Thiruppavai might have been recited as well.

See also 

 Tirupallantu
 Nachiyar Tirumoli
 Periyalvar Tirumoli

References

External links

Thirupavai meaning in English
Short essay on Thiruppavai
Commentary on Thiruppavai
Audio commentary on Thiruppavai
Tiruppavai - viewable in multiple Indian scripts
PDF of Thiruppavai
Thiruppavai Tamil and English lyrics
  (in Tamil)

Tamil-language literature
Hindu texts
Tamil Hindu literature
Naalayira Divya Prabandham